Amendment 54 was a proposed initiative on the Colorado ballot for 2008. It passed with 51.2% of the vote.

Purpose
According to the Blue Book, the state-provided ballot guide, Amendment 54 "proposes amending the Colorado Constitution to:
 prohibit certain government contractors from contributing to a political party or candidate for the contract's duration and two years thereafter;
 prohibit contributors to ballot issue campaigns from entering into certain government contracts relating to the ballot issue;
 apply the prohibitions on campaign contributions and ballot issue contracts to any contractor with a government contract or contracts that does not use a public and competitive bidding process soliciting at least three bids and with a total value greater than $100,000 in a single year; and
 apply the prohibitions on campaign contributions and ballot issue contracts to a labor organization holding a collective bargaining agreement with a state or local government."

Results

Support and opposition

Supporting organization

Yes On Colorado Amendment 54

Opposing organization

Protect Colorado's Future

Injunction issued 

An injunction against Amendment 54 was issued by Denver District Court Judge Catherine Lemon in June 2009. Judge Lemon concluded that the language of the amendment was vague and often confusing, creating a law that would violate the right to free speech.

References 

Amendment 54
Initiatives in the United States
Constitution of Colorado